Azerbaijan–Kenya relations refer to bilateral relations between Azerbaijan and Kenya.

Cooperation between the two countries covers such areas as tourism, science, education, and so on.

Diplomatic relations 
In June 2004, Azerbaijan and Kenya signed a joint communique establishing diplomatic relations.

Azerbaijan's Ambassador to Kenya is Elman Abdullayev.

High-level visits 
On 29 June 2012 the Prime Minister's spouse of Kenya – Ida Odinga paid a visit to Azerbaijan to participate in the Crans Montana Forum held in Baku.

On 5–6 May 2017, the Minister of Sport, Culture and Art of the Republic of Kenya Hasan Vario Arero paid a visit to the Republic of Azerbaijan to attend the World Forum on Intercultural Dialogue held in Baku.
On month December, 2018,The president of East African youth Parliament/Assembly.Hon.Jeremiah Mumo Kisangau visited Baku in Azerbaijan to attend Inter Parliamentary Union (IPU) where he was one of main speaker.

Economic cooperation 
Kenya's exports to Azerbaijan are based on raw materials, agricultural products, and so on.

According to statistical data of the State Customs Committee of Azerbaijan, in January–September 2016, the mutual trade turnover amounted to 617.79 thousand US dollars. The volume of imports increased by 14.3 times.

According to statistics from the UN trade office (COMTRADE), in 2019, the volume of Azerbaijan's exports to Kenya amounted to 354 thousand US dollars. The basis of Azerbaijan's export to Kenya is textiles.

Nargiz Eyvazova, Deputy Chairman of the organization for European integration of youth of Azerbaijan, represented Azerbaijan at the young leaders forum held in Nairobi in March 2012.

See also 
 Foreign relations of Azerbaijan
 Foreign relations of Kenya

References

External links 
 Embassy of Azerbaijan in Nairobi

 
Kenya
Azerbaijan